Globe Pit is a  geological Site of Special Scientific Interest in Little Thurrock in Essex. It is a Geological Conservation Review site.

Natural England describes Globe Pit as "an important site for the interrelationship of archaeology with geology since it is vital in the correlation of the Lower Palaeolithic chronology with the Pleistocene Thames Terrace sequence". Interpretation of the site is controversial, and it is therefore important for future research. There is a considerable quantity of Clactonian flint tools,  dated by Paul Pettit and Mark White to MIS 10 to 9, around 350,000 years ago. 

The site is on private land with no public access.

References 

Sites of Special Scientific Interest in Essex
Thurrock
Geological Conservation Review sites